Daughter of Cloud is a compilation album by psychedelic pop group of Montreal. It was released on the Polyvinyl website and in stores on October 23, 2012.  It contains 17 rarities that the band have recorded since 2007, 10 unreleased and 7 from deleted CDs or 7-inch singles. The album was also released in a special-edition "Cyan" vinyl, which was limited to 500 copies.

Critical reception
The Line of Best Fit wrote that "existing converts will delight in the psychedelic cacophony, but those entering of Montreal’s world for the first time will most likely be left in a state of upheaval and disarray, slightly suffocated by the sheer diversity of ideas packed into such a small space."

Track listing

References

2012 albums
Of Montreal albums